James Frederick Tracy (born 1965) is an American conspiracy theorist and former professor who has espoused the view that some American mass shootings did not occur and are hoaxes.

Tracy holds a PhD degree, awarded by the University of Iowa in 2002. He was previously a tenured professor of communication at Florida Atlantic University at Boca Raton. He maintains that the Boston Marathon bombing was a false flag operation perpetrated by the United States government, and that the Sandy Hook massacre did not occur but was a hoax also perpetrated by the United States government. There is a "Sandy Hook truther" movement founded upon this conspiracy theory.

Tracy demanded that Leonard Pozner, the father of Sandy Hook victim Noah Pozner, provide proof of his son's death. As a result, Florida Atlantic University initiated a procedure to dismiss Tracy, who had tenure, in December 2015. He was dismissed in January 2016, although a statement from his former employer asserted that Tracy was fired for repeatedly neglecting or refusing to file standard paperwork disclosing activities or employment outside his job that might pose conflicts of interest. On April 25, 2016, he filed suit for wrongful termination. On December 12, 2017, Tracy's termination was upheld by a jury.

In 2018, civil rights attorneys for Tracy filed an appeal to the U.S. Court of Appeals for the Eleventh Circuit. In November 2020, Tracy lost the appeal, with the Tampa Bay Times reporting, "The opinion said Tracy argued that 'no reasonable juror could have found that his blog speech did not motivate the university to fire him,' but it concluded that he 'cherry-picks' the evidence and that he was fired for insubordination related to not filing reports about his outside activities."

Tracy then appealed to the United States Supreme Court, but in December of 2021 the court declined his appeal without comment.

References

External links

1965 births
Living people
Florida Atlantic University faculty
American conspiracy theorists
University of Iowa alumni
Place of birth missing (living people)